Shawn Dawson (born 12 December 1993) is an Israeli professional basketball player for Hapoel Holon of the Israeli Basketball Premier League. He is the son of former basketball player Joe Dawson. He was named the Israeli Basketball Super League Most Improved Player in 2014.

Early life 
Dawson was born in Eilat, Israel. His father Joe Dawson is an American basketball player who played in Israel for more than 20 years, and acquired Israeli citizenship upon his marriage. His mother, Iris, is an Israeli woman of Yemenite-Jewish ancestry. His parents divorced when he was 7, and he lived with his mother in Eilat, Israel. 

He played in Hapoel Eilat youth teams until he was 15, before moving to live with his father and his younger brother, Tyler, in Rehovot, Israel. He then joined the Maccabi Rishon LeZion youth team.

Professional career

Maccabi Rishon LeZion (2012–2017) 
In 2012, Dawson started his professional career with Maccabi Rishon LeZion. On 14 October 2012, Dawson made his professional debut in a 70–54 win over Hapoel Gilboa Galil, scoring two points off the bench. He was named the Israeli Basketball Super League Most Improved Player in 2014.

In his third season with Rishon LeZion, Dawson made his breakthrough season averaging 14.6 points, 5.8 rebounds, 2.1 assists and 1.6 steals per game. Dawson helped the team to reach the 2015 Israeli League Semifinals, where they eventually were eliminated by Hapoel Jerusalem. Dawson was named 2015 All-Israeli League First Team and the 2015 Israeli League Rising Star.

On 9 May 2015, Dawson signed a two-year contract extension with Maccabi Rishon LeZion. On 9 June 2016, Dawson recorded 21 points, shooting 5-of-7 from three-point range, along with five rebounds, three assists and three steals and helped Rishon LeZion to win the 2016 Israeli League Championship after an 83–77 win over Hapoel Jerusalem.

In July 2016, Dawson joined the Washington Wizards for the 2016 NBA Summer League. On 12 August 2016, he signed with the New Orleans Pelicans of the NBA. However, he was later waived by the Pelicans on 21 October, after appearing in three preseason games with them.

On 24 October 2016, Dawson returned to Maccabi Rishon LeZion for the rest of the season. On 29 January 2017, Dawson recorded a career-high 31 points, shooting 12-of-20 from the field, along with seven rebounds, three assists and six steals in a 92–93 loss to Hapoel Gilboa Galil. Dawson helped Rishon LeZion reach the 2017 Israeli League Final Four, where they eventually lost to Hapoel Jerusalem.

Bnei Herzliya (2017–2018) 
On 18 July 2017, Dawson signed a two-year deal with Bnei Herzliya. On 6 December 2017, Dawson recorded a season-high 30 points, shooting 5-of-8 from three-point range, along with four rebounds and two assists in 87–83 win over Charleroi. a On 14 May 2018, Dawson recorded 20 points along with seven rebounds, four assists and two steals in a 78–64 win over Maccabi Haifa. He was subsequently named Israeli League Round 31 MVP.

In 41 games played during the 2017–18 season, he averaged 15.5 points, 5.4 rebounds, 2.1 assists and 1.1 steals per game.

Divina Seguros Joventut (2018–2021) 
In July 2018, Dawson joined the Brooklyn Nets for the 2018 NBA Summer League, where he averaged 11.2 points, 3.2 rebounds and 1.6 assists per game.

On 27 July 2018, Dawson signed a one-year deal with the Spanish team Divina Seguros Joventut for the 2018–19 season. On 28 October 2018, Dawson recorded a season-high 20 points, shooting 3-of-5 from three-point range, along with four rebounds and five assists in a 92-94 loss to Barcelona. On 27 January 2019, Dawson has been ruled out for the rest of the season after he suffered an ACL injury in a match against Gran Canaria. In 18 games played during the 2018–19 season, he averaged 11.6 points, 4.2 rebounds, 1.5 assists, while shooting 40 percent from three-point range.

On 28 February 2019, Dawson signed a one-year contract extension with Joventut. On 30 October 2019, Dawson suffered another season-ending injury in his season debut, after he ruptured his achilles in a EuroCup match against Cedevita Olimpija.

On 20 January 2020, Dawson signed a two-year contract extension with Joventut. He parted ways with the team on 16 June 2021.

Return to Bnei Herzliya (2021–2022) 
On 23 August 2021, Dawson returned to Bnei Herzliya.

Hapoel Holon (2022–present) 
In summer 2022, he has signed with Hapoel Holon of the Israeli Basketball Premier League.

National team career 
Dawson is a member of the Israeli national team. He participated in the 2015 and the 2017 Eurobasket tournaments.

See also
List of select Jewish basketball players

References

External links 
Dawson's profile at RealGM.com
Dawson's profile at FIBA.com
Dawson's profile at DraftExpress.com

1993 births
Living people
Black Jewish people
Bnei Hertzeliya basketball players
Hapoel Holon players
Israeli Basketball Premier League players
Israeli expatriate basketball people in Spain
Israeli men's basketball players
Israeli people of African-American descent
Israeli people of Yemeni-Jewish descent
Jewish men's basketball players
Joventut Badalona players
Liga ACB players
Maccabi Rishon LeZion basketball players
People from Eilat
Shooting guards
Small forwards